"You're a Special Part of Me" was a successful duet single for soul singers and Motown label mates Diana Ross & Marvin Gaye, released in 1973. The original duet was one of the few originals featured on their famed album, Diana & Marvin, and was among the most successful of the songs the Motown label mates made reaching #4 on the Billboard R&B Singles chart and #12 on the Billboard Pop Singles chart.

Remixes
There are several mixes of this song which have been released: the single mix, the album mix, the Japanese Quadraphonic album mix, and an alternate mix released in 1995 on the "Motown Year By Year: 1973" CD, which clocks in at 4:29.

Personnel
Lead vocals by Marvin Gaye and Diana Ross
Background vocals by assorted singers
Instrumentation by The Funk Brothers

Chart performance

References

1973 singles
Diana Ross songs
Marvin Gaye songs
Male–female vocal duets
Song recordings produced by Berry Gordy
1973 songs
Motown singles